John Butler (born 4 July 1972) is an Irish director, screenwriter, and novelist. in 2011, Picador published his novel "The Tenderloin". His TV work includes sketch show Your Bad Self (which won an IFTA for best entertainment show), and writing and directing on "The Outlaws" (starring Stephen Merchant and Christopher Walken) for BBC / Amazon. His feature films are The Stag,  Handsome Devil. and Papi Chulo. Other writing has appeared in The Irish Times, the Dublin Review and elsewhere.

Life and career
Butler was born in Dublin, Ireland. He attended Blackrock College, an all-boys Catholic school in Dublin. He then went to University College Dublin, obtaining a bachelor's degree in English Greek and Roman, and a master's degree in Film Studies.

Butler is gay. He is a supporter of Liverpool FC.

Filmography

Films

As director

Television

As director

References

External links
 

Irish film directors
Irish male screenwriters
People educated at Blackrock College
21st-century Irish male writers
Irish male novelists
Irish gay writers
Living people
1972 births
Gay screenwriters
Gay novelists
Irish LGBT novelists
Irish LGBT screenwriters
Alumni of University College Dublin